Georgina (Gina) Stevens (born 4 July 1975) is a retired Australian women's basketball player, who represented the country at both junior and senior levels.

Biography

Stevens played in the Women's National Basketball League (WNBL) between 1992 and 2004. During that period Stevens played for four teams; AIS (1992 to 1993), Perth Breakers (1994 to 1999/00), Bulleen Boomers (2000/01) and Townsville Fire (2002/03 to 2003/04), totaling 204 games.

In 1996, Stevens won the WNBL Top Shooter Award with 375 points at an average of 21.3 points per game. Stevens was also selected to the WNBL All-Star Five on two occasions; 1996 and 1998/99.

At official FIBA tournaments, Stevens played for Australia at the 1993 World Championship for Junior Women, where she won a Gold medal.

See also

 WNBL Top Shooter Award
 WNBL All-Star Five

References

Living people
1975 births
Australian women's basketball players
Australian Institute of Sport basketball (WNBL) players
Melbourne Boomers players
Townsville Fire players
Perth Lynx players
Sportspeople from Ballarat
Forwards (basketball)